Pratap Bhanu Sharma (born 6 March 1947) is an Indian politician and a senior leader of the Indian National Congress. He has been member of the 7th and 8th Lok Sabha (Lower House of the Indian Parliament) from Vidisha, Madhya Pradesh.

Mechanical Engineer, industrialist and educationalist, he has also undertaken various social activities including implementing rural development program, specially transfer of technology for rural uses and to help weaker sections; assisting unemployed youth and young entrepreneurs for promoting self-employment schemes and industries during his tenure as Member of Parliament.

Political career 

Sharma has been President of Madhya Pradesh Indian National Congress between 1975–76, District Small Scale Industries Organisation and District Chamber of Commerce and Industry. He has also been Chairman of Madhya Pradesh Lahu-Udyog Engineers Association between 1975–80 and Small Industries Development Society in 1980. He was elected as Member of Parliament in 1980 and 1984 from Vidisha Lok Sabha constituency. He is currently Vice President of the Madhya Pradesh Indian National Congress/ Youth Congress.

References

External links 
  Official website of INC

India MPs 1980–1984
India MPs 1984–1989
1947 births
Living people
Indian National Congress politicians
People from Vidisha
Lok Sabha members from Madhya Pradesh
Indian National Congress politicians from Madhya Pradesh